Bruno Bertacchini (1916-2003) was a Grand Prix motorcycle racer from Italy.

Career statistics

By season

References

External links
 Profile on motogp.com
 https://www.guzzipedia.it/persone/bruno-bertacchini/

Italian motorcycle racers
500cc World Championship riders
1916 births
2003 deaths